Daniel "Dani" Sandoval Fernández (born 16 February 1998) is a Spanish footballer who plays as a left winger for Real Oviedo Vetusta.

Club career
Born in Gijón, Asturias, Sandoval joined Real Oviedo's youth setup in 2015, from TSK Roces. He made his senior debut with the reserves on 25 February 2017, coming on as a second-half substitute in a 2–0 Tercera División home win against Atlético de Lugones SD.

Sandoval contributed with four goals in 26 appearances during the 2017–18 season, helping the B-side in their promotion to Segunda División B. On 13 July 2019, he signed a two-year deal with another reserve team, Atlético Levante UD also in the third division.

On 3 October 2020, Sandoval signed for fellow third division side Real Murcia. The following 29 January, however, he returned to Oviedo and their B-team in the same category.

Sandoval made his professional debut with Oviedo on 29 May 2021, replacing Marco Sangalli late into a 2–2 away draw against CD Tenerife in the Segunda División championship.

References

External links

1998 births
Living people
Footballers from Gijón
Spanish footballers
Association football wingers
Segunda División players
Segunda División B players
Tercera División players
Real Oviedo Vetusta players
Atlético Levante UD players
Real Murcia players
Real Oviedo players